Raleigh is the capital city of the state of North Carolina and the seat of Wake County in the United States. It is the second-most populous city in North Carolina, after Charlotte. Raleigh is the tenth-most populous city in the Southeast, the 41st-most populous city in the U.S., and the largest city of the Research Triangle metro area. Raleigh is known as the "City of Oaks" for its many oak trees, which line the streets in the heart of the city. The U.S. Census Bureau counted the city's population as 467,665 in the 2020 census. It is one of the fastest-growing cities in the United States. The city of Raleigh is named after Sir Walter Raleigh, who established the now-lost Roanoke Colony in present-day Dare County.

Raleigh is home to North Carolina State University (NC State) and is part of the Research Triangle together with Durham (home of Duke University and North Carolina Central University) and Chapel Hill (home of the University of North Carolina at Chapel Hill). The name of the Research Triangle (often shortened to the "Triangle") originated after the 1959 creation of Research Triangle Park (RTP), located in Durham and Wake counties, among the three cities and universities. The Triangle encompasses the U.S. Census Bureau's Raleigh-Durham-Cary Combined Statistical Area (CSA), which had an estimated population of 2,037,430 in 2013. The Raleigh Metropolitan Statistical Area had an estimated population of 1,390,785 in 2019.

Most of Raleigh is located within Wake County, with a small portion extending into Durham County. The towns of Cary, Morrisville, Garner, Clayton, Wake Forest, Apex, Holly Springs, Fuquay-Varina, Knightdale, Wendell, Zebulon, and Rolesville are some of Raleigh's primary nearby suburbs and satellite towns.

Raleigh is an early example in the United States of a planned city. Following the American Revolutionary War when the U.S. gained independence, the area was chosen as the site of the state capital in 1788 and incorporated in 1792 as such. The city was originally laid out in a grid pattern with the North Carolina State Capitol at the center, in Union Square. During the American Civil War, the city was spared from any significant battle. It fell to the Union in the closing days of the war and struggled with the economic hardships in the postwar period, related to the reconstitution of labor markets, over-reliance on agriculture and the social unrest of the Reconstruction Era. The establishment of the Research Triangle Park (RTP) in 1959 helped create tens of thousands of jobs in the fields of science and technology. By the early 21st century, Raleigh had become one of the fastest-growing cities in the United States.

History

Earlier capitals
Bath, the oldest town in North Carolina, was the first nominal capital of the colony from 1705 until 1722, when Edenton took over the role. The colony had no permanent institutions of government until the new capital, New Bern, was established in 1743.

18th century
In December 1770, Joel Lane successfully petitioned the North Carolina General Assembly to create a new county. On January 5, 1771, the bill creating Wake County was passed in the General Assembly. The county was formed from portions of Cumberland, Orange, and Johnston counties, and was named for Margaret Wake Tryon, the wife of Governor William Tryon. The first county seat was Bloomsbury.

New Bern, a port town on the Neuse River  from the Atlantic Ocean, was the largest city and the capital of North Carolina during the American Revolution. When the British Army laid siege to the city, that site could no longer be used as the capital. From 1789 to 1794, when Raleigh was being built, the state capital was Fayetteville.

Raleigh was chosen as the site of the new capital in 1788, as its central location protected it from attacks from the coast. It was officially established in 1792 as both county seat and state capital. The city was incorporated on December 31, 1792, and a charter granted January 21, 1795. The city was named for Sir Walter Raleigh, sponsor of Roanoke, the "lost colony" on Roanoke Island.

No known city or town existed previously on the chosen city site. Raleigh is one of the few cities in the United States that was planned and built specifically to serve as a state capital. Its original boundaries were formed by the downtown streets of North, East, West and South. The plan, a grid with two main axes meeting at a central square and an additional square in each corner, was based on Thomas Holme's 1682 plan for Philadelphia. The city was developed on the land of various plantations including Mordecai, Wakefield, Oak View, Spring Hill, Pine Hall, Crabtree, and Pullen.

The North Carolina General Assembly first met in Raleigh in December 1794, and granted the city a charter, with a board of seven appointed commissioners and an "Intendant of Police" (which developed as the office of Mayor) to govern it. After 1803, city commissioners were elected. In 1799, the N.C. Minerva and Raleigh Advertiser was the first newspaper published in Raleigh. John Haywood was the first Intendant of Police.

19th century

In 1808, Andrew Johnson, the United States' future 17th President, was born at Casso's Inn in Raleigh. The city's first water supply network was completed in 1818, although due to system failures, the project was abandoned. In 1819 Raleigh's first volunteer fire company was founded, followed in 1821 by a full-time fire company.

In 1817, the Episcopal Diocese of North Carolina was established and headquartered in Raleigh.

In 1831, a fire destroyed the North Carolina State House. Two years later, reconstruction began with quarried gneiss being delivered by the first railroad in the state. Raleigh celebrated the completion of the new State Capitol and new Raleigh & Gaston Railroad Company in 1840.

In 1853, the first State Fair was held near Raleigh. The first institution of higher learning in Raleigh, Peace College, was established in 1857. Raleigh's Historic Oakwood contains many houses from the 19th century that are still in good condition.

North Carolina seceded from the Union during the American Civil War. After the war began, Governor Zebulon Baird Vance ordered the construction of breastworks around the city as protection from Union troops. Near the end of the Civil War, Governor Vance arranged his evacuation to avoid capture as Union General William Sherman's forces approached the city. Before leaving, Vance met with former governors Graham and Swain to draft a letter of surrender for Raleigh. Their intention was to protect Raleigh from the destruction inflicted on other cities by Union troops. Graham and Swain departed to meet the advancing Federal forces on the morning of April 12, 1865, and were to return by that evening. The evening struck, but Graham and Swain had not returned due to train delays and their temporary capture by Sherman. Governor Vance left the evening after Graham and Sherman failed to return, leaving behind a letter giving Mayor William H. Harrison the authority to surrender. On the morning of April 13, Mayor Harrison among others went to the southern Wake County area to meet General Hugh Judson Kilpatrick and propose surrender. Kenneth Rayner, a long-time resident of Raleigh, delivered the proposal including a promise of no resistance. Kilpatrick agreed to accept the surrender and protect Raleigh from destruction. Kilpatrick's cavalry occupied Raleigh and removed the flagpole from the state capitol, replacing it with a United States Flag above the dome. Sherman arrived shortly after and established his headquarters in the governor's mansion. The city was spared significant destruction during the war. As Confederate cavalry retreated west, Union soldiers followed, leading to the Battle of Morrisville nearby.

Due to the economic and social problems of the post-war period and Reconstruction, with a state economy still heavily dependent on agriculture, the city grew little over the next several decades.

Shaw University, the South's first African American college, began classes in 1865 and was chartered in 1875. Its Estey Hall was the first building constructed for the higher education of Black women, and Leonard Medical Center was the first four-year medical school in the country for African Americans.

In 1867, Episcopal clergy founded St. Augustine's College for the education of freedmen. The biracial Reconstruction legislature created new welfare institutions: in 1869, it approved the United States' first school for blind and deaf Black people, to be located in Raleigh. In 1874, the federal government constructed the Federal Building in Raleigh, the first federal government project in the Southern U.S. following the Civil War.

In 1880, the newspapers News and Observer combined to form The News & Observer. It continues to be Raleigh's primary daily newspaper. The North Carolina College of Agriculture and Mechanic Arts, now known as North Carolina State University, was founded as a land-grant college in 1887. The city's Rex Hospital opened in 1889 and included the state's first nursing school. The Baptist Women's College, now known as Meredith College, opened in 1891, and in 1898, The Academy of Music, a private music conservatory, was established.

In the late nineteenth century, two Black Congressmen were elected from North Carolina's 2nd district, the last in 1898. George Henry White sought to promote civil rights for Black citizens and to challenge efforts by White Democrats to reduce Black voting by new discriminatory laws. He and his allies were unsuccessful. Based on a White supremacy campaign that returned Democrats to dominance, in 1900 the state legislature passed a new constitution, with a suffrage amendment that raised barriers to voter registration, resulting in the disenfranchisement of most Black citizens and many poor White citizens. Loss of the ability to vote also disqualified Black men (and later women) from sitting on juries and serving in any office—local, state or federal. The rising Black middle-class in Raleigh and other areas was politically silenced and shut out of local governance, and the Republican Party was no longer competitive in the state.

It was not until after federal civil rights legislation was passed in the mid-1960s that the majority of Black citizens in North Carolina would again be able to vote, sit on juries and serve in local offices. By that time many African Americans had left the state in the Great Migration to northern industrial cities for more opportunities. No African American was elected to Congress from North Carolina until 1992.

20th century

In 1912, Bloomsbury Park opened, featuring a popular carousel ride. Relocated to Pullen Park, the Pullen Park Carousel is still operating.

From 1914 to 1917, an influenza epidemic killed 288 Raleighites.

In 1922, WLAC signed on as the city's first radio station, but lasted only two years. WFBQ signed on in 1924 and became WPTF in 1927. It is now Raleigh's oldest continuous radio broadcaster.

In 1923, the Raleigh Fall Festival was formed. The Festival was reorganized as the North Carolina Debutante Ball in 1927.

Following immigration by Catholics, on December 12, 1924, the Roman Catholic Diocese of Raleigh was officially established by Pope Pius XI. The Sacred Heart Cathedral became the official seat of the diocese with William Joseph Hafey as its bishop.

The city's first airport, Curtiss-Wright Flying Field, opened in 1929. That same year, the stock market crash resulted in six Raleigh banks closing.

During the difficult 1930s of the Great Depression, government at all levels was integral to creating jobs. The city provided recreational and educational programs, and hired people for public works projects. In 1932, Raleigh Memorial Auditorium was dedicated. The North Carolina Symphony, founded the same year, performed in its new home. From 1934 to 1937, the federal Civilian Conservation Corps constructed the area now known as William B. Umstead State Park. In 1939, the State General Assembly chartered the Raleigh-Durham Aeronautical Authority to build a larger airport between Raleigh and Durham, with the first flight occurring in 1943.

In 1947, Raleigh citizens adopted a council–manager form of government, which is still the city's current form of government. Council members are elected from single-member districts. They hire a city manager.

The Dorton Arena, a 7,610-seat multi-purpose arena designed by Matthew Nowicki, was opened in 1952 on the grounds of the North Carolina State Fair. It was listed in the National Register of Historic Places in 1973.

Raleigh experienced significant damage from Hurricane Hazel in 1954.

In 1953, WNAO-TV, channel 28, became the city's first television station, though it folded in 1957.

With the opening of the Research Triangle Park in 1959, Raleigh began to experience a population increase, resulting in a total city population of 100,000 by 1960. In 1960, the Census Bureau reported Raleigh's population as 76.4% White and 23.4% Black.

Following the passage of the federal Voting Rights Act of 1965, one of the main achievements of the Civil Rights Movement and the Lyndon B. Johnson presidency, political participation and voting by African Americans in Raleigh increased rapidly.

From the early-to-mid 20th century East Hargett Street was known as Raleigh's "Black Main Street" and hosted numerous Black-owned businesses. The area declined after the city desegregated its establishments.

By the early 1970s people in Raleigh were growing increasingly concerned about growth and urban sprawl. Community organizations felt that municipal offices were being too heavily influenced by business interests when the city's population was rapidly growing and various development projects were being proposed. At their behest, the municipal elections were altered so that the mayor was to be directly elected, instead of being selected by the city council. Most city council seats were then made responsible to districts, instead of being held at-large. The 1973 elections were the first contests affected by the reforms. City Councilman Clarence Lightner defeated Raleigh Merchants bureau Executive Director G. Wesley Williams to become Raleigh's first Black mayor, and thus the first Black mayor in a major White-majority city in the South.

In 1976, the Raleigh City and Wake County schools merged to become the Wake County Public School System, now the largest school system in the state and 19th largest in the country.

During the 1970s and 1980s, the I-440 beltline was constructed, in an attempt to ease traffic congestion and providing access to most major city roads.

The first Raleigh Convention Center (replaced in 2008) and Fayetteville Street Mall were both opened in 1977. Fayetteville Street was turned into a pedestrian-only street in an effort to help the then-ailing downtown area, but the plan was flawed and business declined for years to come. Fayetteville Street was reopened in 2007 as the main thoroughfare of Raleigh's downtown.

During the 1988 Raleigh tornado outbreak of November 28, 1988, the city was affected by the most destructive of the seven tornadoes reported in Northeastern North Carolina and southeastern Virginia between 1:00 am and 5:45 am. The Raleigh tornado produced over $77 million in damage, along with four fatalities (two in the city of Raleigh, and two in Nash County) and 154 injuries. The tornado was rated F4.

In 1991, two large skyscrapers in Raleigh were completed, First Union Capitol Center and Two Hannover Square, along with the popular Coastal Credit Union Music Park at Walnut Creek in Southeast Raleigh.

In 1996, the Olympic Flame passed through Raleigh while on its way to the 1996 Summer Olympics in Atlanta. Also in 1996, Hurricane Fran struck the area, causing massive flooding and extensive structural damage. In addition, WRAL-TV became the first High-Definition broadcast station in the world.

In 1997, the National Hockey League's Hartford Whalers announced their intention to move to Raleigh as the Carolina Hurricanes, becoming the city's first major league professional sports franchise.

In 1999, the Raleigh Entertainment and Sports Arena (later renamed the RBC Center and now called PNC Arena), opened to provide a home for the Hurricanes and the NC State Wolfpack men's basketball team, as well as an up-to-date major concert venue.

21st century

In the first decade of the 21st century, Raleigh was featured prominently in a number of "Top 10 Lists", including those by Forbes, MSNBC and Money magazine, due to its quality of life and favorable business climate.

In 2001, the Raleigh Memorial Auditorium complex was expanded with the addition of the Progress Energy Center for the Performing Arts, Meymandi Concert Hall, Fletcher Opera Theater, Kennedy Theatre, Betty Ray McCain Gallery and Lichtin Plaza.

Fayetteville Street reopened to vehicular traffic in 2006. A variety of downtown building projects began around this time including the 34-story RBC Bank Tower, multiple condominium projects and several new restaurants. Additional skyscrapers are in the proposal/planning phase.

In 2006, the city's NHL franchise, the Carolina Hurricanes, won the Stanley Cup, North Carolina's first and only professional sports championship.

With the opening of parts of I-540 from 2005 to 2007, a new  loop around Wake County, traffic congestion eased somewhat in the North Raleigh area. Completion of the entire loop is expected to take another 15 years.

In 2008, the city's Fayetteville Street Historic District joined the National Register of Historic Places.

In September 2010, Raleigh hosted the inaugural Hopscotch Music Festival.

In January 2011, Raleigh hosted the National Hockey League All-Star Game.

In April 2011, a devastating EF-3 tornado hit Raleigh, and many other tornadoes touched down in the state (ultimately the largest, but not the strongest outbreak to ever hit the state), killing 24 people. The tornado tracked northeast through parts of Downtown, East Central Raleigh and Northeast Raleigh and produced $115 million in damages in Wake County. There were 4 fatalities in the city.

In September 2015, Holy Trinity Anglican Church was opened; the first church to be built in downtown Raleigh since 1958.

On July 26, 2017, the Catholic Diocese of Raleigh dedicated its new cathedral, Holy Name of Jesus Cathedral, the fifth-largest in the United States.

On October 13, 2022, a spree shooting occurred in Raleigh's Hedingham neighborhood. Five people were killed, and two others were injured. The suspect, a 15-year-old boy, was detained after being cornered by police at a nearby residence and is in critical condition from injuries sustained during the incident.

Geography

The Neuse River flows through the northeastern corner of the city.

Raleigh is located in the northeast central region of North Carolina, where the Piedmont and Atlantic coastal plain regions meet. This area is known as the "fall line" because it marks the elevation inland at which waterfalls begin to appear in creeks and rivers. As a result, most of Raleigh features gently rolling hills that slope eastward toward the state's flat coastal plain.

A small portion of Raleigh is located in Durham County, North Carolina.

Cityscape

Raleigh is divided into several major geographic areas, each of which use a Raleigh address and a ZIP code that begins with the digits 276. PNC Plaza, formerly known as RBC Plaza, is the largest and tallest skyscraper in the city of Raleigh.

Inside the Beltline

One common division of Raleigh is to differentiate the central part of the city, which lies inside of the circumferential highway known as the Raleigh Beltline (I-440 and I-40) from areas outside of the Beltline. The area inside of the beltline includes the entirety of the central business district known as Downtown Raleigh, as well as several more residential areas surrounding it.

The downtown area is home to historic buildings such as the Sir Walter Raleigh Hotel built in the early 20th century, the restored City Market, the Fayetteville Street downtown business district (which includes the PNC Plaza and Wells Fargo Capitol Center buildings), as well as the North Carolina Museum of History, North Carolina Museum of Natural Sciences, North Carolina State Capitol, William Peace University, the City of Raleigh Museum, Raleigh Convention Center, Shaw University, Campbell University School of Law, and St. Augustine's College. In the 2000s, an effort by the Downtown Raleigh Alliance was made to separate this area of the city into five smaller districts: Fayetteville Street, Moore Square, Glenwood South, Warehouse (Raleigh), and Capital District (Raleigh). 

Some of the names have become commonplace among locals, such as the Warehouse District, Fayetteville Street, and Glenwood South. Other neighborhoods lying inside the Beltline include Cameron Park, Boylan Heights, Country Club Hills, Coley Forest, Five Points, Budleigh, Glenwood-Brooklyn, Hayes Barton Historic District, Moore Square, Mordecai (home to the historic Mordecai House), Rochester Heights, South Park, Rosengarten Park, Belvidere Park, Woodcrest, Oberlin Village, and Historic Oakwood. These neighborhoods were typically built before World War II, and roughly correspond to the extent of the city of Raleigh before the population boom of the latter half of the 20th century led to growth of the city limits beyond the historic urban core.

Midtown Raleigh

Midtown Raleigh is a relatively new term used to describe the residential and commercial area lying on the northside of the I-440 Beltline and is part of North Raleigh. It is roughly framed by Glenwood/Six Forks Road to the West, Wake Forest Road to the East, and Millbrook Road to the North. It includes shopping centers such as North Hills and Crabtree Valley Mall. It also includes North Hills Park and part of the Raleigh Greenway System. The term was coined by the Greater Raleigh Chamber of Commerce, developer John Kane and planning director Mitchell Silver. The News & Observer newspaper started using the term for marketing purposes only. The Midtown Raleigh Alliance was founded on July 25, 2011, as a way for community leaders to promote the area. The center of the area, especially around the North Hills development at the junction of Six Forks Road and the Beltline, is experiencing rapid urbanization as several high-rise buildings have been built since 2010.

East Raleigh
East Raleigh is situated roughly from Capital Boulevard near the I-440 beltline to New Hope Road. Most of East Raleigh's development is along primary corridors such as U.S. 1 (Capital Boulevard), New Bern Avenue, Poole Road, Buffaloe Road, and New Hope Road. Neighborhoods in East Raleigh include Hedingham, Longview, Lockwood, Madonna Acres, New Hope, Thompson-Hunter and Wilder's Grove. The area is bordered to the east by the town of Knightdale.

West Raleigh

West Raleigh lies along Hillsborough Street and Western Boulevard. The area is bordered to the west and south by Cary. It is home to North Carolina State University, Meredith College, Pullen Park, Pullen Memorial Baptist Church, the Islamic Association of Raleigh, Village District, Lake Johnson, the North Carolina Museum of Art and historic Saint Mary's School. Primary thoroughfares serving West Raleigh, in addition to Hillsborough Street, are Avent Ferry Road, Blue Ridge Road, and Western Boulevard. The PNC Arena is also located here adjacent to the North Carolina State Fairgrounds. These are located approximately 2 miles from Rex Hospital.

North Raleigh
North Raleigh is an expansive, diverse, and fast-growing suburban area of the city that is home to established neighborhoods to the south along with many newly built subdivisions and along its northern fringes. The area generally falls North of Millbrook Road. It is primarily suburban with large shopping areas. Primary neighborhoods and subdivisions in North Raleigh include Bartons Creek Bluffs, Bedford, Bent Tree, Black Horse Run, Brier Creek, Brookhaven, Coachman's Trail, Crossgate, Crosswinds, Dominion Park, Durant Trails, Ethan's Glenn, Falls River, Greystone Village, Harrington Grove, Hidden Valley, Lake Park, Long Lake, North Haven, North Ridge, Oakcroft, Shannon Woods, Six Forks Station, Springdale Estates, Stonebridge, Stone Creek, Stonehenge, Summerfield, The Sanctuary, Valley Estates, Wakefield, Weathersfield, Windsor Forest, and Wood Valley. The area is served by a number of primary transportation corridors including Glenwood Avenue U.S. Route 70, Interstate 540, Wake Forest Road, Millbrook Road, Lynn Road, Six Forks Road, Spring Forest Road, Creedmoor Road, Leesville Road, Norwood Road, Strickland Road, and North Hills Drive.

South Raleigh
South Raleigh is located along U.S. 401 south toward Fuquay-Varina and along US 70 into suburban Garner. This area is the least developed and least dense area of Raleigh (much of the area lies within the Swift Creek watershed district, where development regulations limit housing densities and construction). The area is bordered to the west by Cary, to the east by Garner, to the southwest by Holly Springs and the southeast by Fuquay-Varina. Neighborhoods in South Raleigh include Eagle Creek, Renaissance Park, Lake Wheeler, Swift Creek, Carolina Pines, Rhamkatte, Riverbrooke, and Enchanted Oaks.

Southeast Raleigh
Southeast Raleigh is bounded by downtown on the west, Garner on the southwest, and rural Wake County to the southeast. The area includes areas along Rock Quarry Road, Poole Road, and New Bern Avenue. Primary neighborhoods include Abbington Ridge, Pearl Ridge, Chastain, Chavis Heights, Raleigh Country Club, Southgate, Kingwood Forest, Rochester Heights, Emerald Village, Worthdale and Biltmore Hills. Coastal Credit Union Music Park (formerly Time Warner Cable Music Pavilion, Alltel Pavilion and Walnut Creek Amphitheatre) is one of the region's major outdoor concert venues and is located on Rock Quarry Road. Shaw University is located in this part of the city. Starting in 2020, large tracts of formerly unoccupied land along Rock Quarry Road between New Hope Road and Barwell Road, and between Barwell Road and Battle Bridge Road, have been cleared for new developments.

Climate
Like much of the Southeastern United States, Raleigh has a humid subtropical climate (Köppen Cfa). On average, there are 69 nights per year that drop to or below freezing, and only 2.7 days that fail to rise above freezing. Annual and monthly temperature and precipitation data are in chart below, based on 1991–2020 climate data. Precipitation is well distributed around the year, with a slight maximum between July and September, owing to generally frequent, sometimes heavy, showers and thunderstorms, and the threat of tropical weather systems (primarily in from August to early October) bringing heavy rainfall. There are 48 days per year with highs at or above . Autumn is similar to spring overall but has fewer days of rainfall, but greater potential for extremely heavy rainfall in a one/two-day period, owing to occasional threat from tropical weather systems (hurricanes and tropical storms) packing torrential rainfall. In September 1999, Raleigh recorded its wettest month ever, with over 21 inches of rain, due to torrential rainfall from tropical weather systems, most notably Hurricane Floyd on September 15–16. Raleigh falls in USDA hardiness zones 7b (5 °F to 10 °F) and 8a (10 °F to 15 °F). Freezing rain and sleet also occur most winters, and occasionally the area experiences a major damaging ice storm. On January 24–25, 2000, Raleigh received its greatest snowfall from a single stormthe Winter Storm of January 2000. Storms of this magnitude are generally the result of cold air damming that affects the city due to its proximity to the Appalachian Mountains. Winter storms have caused traffic problems in the past as well.

The region also experiences occasional periods of drought, during which the city sometimes has restricted water use by residents. During the late summer and early fall, Raleigh can experience hurricanes. In 1996, Hurricane Fran caused severe damage in the Raleigh area, mostly from falling trees. Hurricanes Dennis and Floyd in September 1999 were primary contributors to that month's extreme rainfall of over 21 inches. The most recent hurricane to have a considerable effect on the area was Hurricane Florence in 2018. Tornadoes also have on occasion affected the city of Raleigh, most notably the November 28, 1988, tornado which occurred in the early morning hours and rated F4 on the Fujita scale and affected northwestern portions of the city. There also was the April 16, 2011, EF3 tornado, which affected portions of downtown and northeast Raleigh and the suburb of Holly Springs.

Demographics

As of the 2020 United States census, there were 467,665 people, 188,412 households, and 104,848 families residing in the city. In the American Community Survey of 2019, the city of Raleigh's population was estimated at 474,708; an earlier estimate determined the population at 474,069. At the 2000 United States census, there were 276,093 persons (July 2008 estimate was 380,173) and 61,371 families residing in Raleigh. The population density was 2,409.2 people per square mile (930.2/km2). There were 120,699 housing units at an average density of 1,053.2 per square mile (406.7/km2).

There were 112,608 households in the city in 2000, of which 26.5% included children below the age of 18, 39.5% were composed of married couples living together, 11.4% reported a female householder with no husband present, and 45.5% classified themselves as nonfamily. Unmarried partners were present in 2.2% of households. In addition, 33.1% of all households were composed of individuals living alone, of which 6.2% was someone 65 years of age or older. The average household size in Raleigh was 2.30 persons, and the average family size was 2.97 persons. Raleigh's population in 2000 was evenly distributed with 20.9% below the age of 18, 15.9% aged 18 to 24, 36.6% from 25 to 44, and 18.4% from 45 to 64. An estimated 8.3% of the population was 65 years of age or older, and the median age was 31 years. For every 100 females, there were 98.0 males; for every 100 females aged 18 or older, there were 96.6 males aged 18 or older.

The median household income in the city was $46,612 in 2000, and the median family income was $60,003. Males earned a median income of $39,248, versus $30,656 for females. The median per capita income for the city was $25,113, and an estimated 11.5% of the population and 7.1% of families were living below the poverty line. Of the total population, 18.8% of those below the age of 18, and 9.3% of those 65 and older, were living below the poverty line. In 2019, an estimated 10.9% of the local population were at or below the poverty line. The median household income from 2014 to 2018 was $63,891 and the per capita income was $36,875. There were 180,046 households with an average of 2.43 persons per household. The median value of an owner-occupied housing unit was $236,700 in 2018 and the monthly cost with a mortgage was $1,480. The cost without a mortgage was $526. Raleigh had a median gross rent of $1,074.

Race and ethnicity 

Note: the US Census treats Hispanic/Latino as an ethnic category. This table excludes Latinos from the racial categories and assigns them to a separate category. Hispanics/Latinos can be of any race.

The racial makeup of Raleigh in 2019 was 52.5% non-Hispanic White, 28.3% Black or African American, 0.4% American Indian or Alaska Native, 4.0% Asian American, 0.1% from some other race, 2.1% two or more races, 12.5% Hispanic or Latin American of any race. According to the 2010 United States census, the racial composition of the city was: 57.5% White (53.3% non-Hispanic White), 29.3% Black or African American, 4.3% Asian American (1.2% Indian, 0.8% Chinese, 0.7% Vietnamese, 0.5% Korean, 0.4% Filipino, 0.1% Japanese), 2.6% two or more races, 1.4% some other race, 0.5% Native American, and <0.1% Native Hawaiian or other Pacific Islander In addition, 11.4% of city residents were Hispanic or Latino Americans, of any race (5.9% Mexican, 1.1% Puerto Rican, 0.9% Salvadoran, 0.6% Dominican, 0.6% Honduran, 0.3% Colombian, 0.3% Cuban, 0.2% Guatemalan, 0.2% Spanish, 0.2% Peruvian, 0.1% Venezuelan, 0.1% Ecuadorian, 0.1% Argentine, and 0.1% Panamanian). In 2000, the racial composition of the city was: 63.31% White, 27.80% Black or African American, 7.01% Hispanic or Latino American, 3.38% Asian American, 0.36% Native American, 0.04% Native Hawaiian or other Pacific Islander, 3.24% some other race, and 1.88% two or more races.

Religion
Raleigh is home to a wide variety of religious practitioners. The predominant religion in Raleigh is Christianity, with the largest numbers of adherents being Baptist (14.1%), Methodist (5.6%), and Roman Catholic (4.2%). Others include Presbyterianism (2.8%), Pentecostalism (1.7%), Anglicanism/Episcopalianism (1.2%), Lutheranism (0.6%), the Latter-Day Saints (0.7%), and other Christian denominations (10.2%) including the Eastern Orthodox, Oriental Orthodox, Jehovah's Witness, Christian Science, Christian Unitarianism, other Mainline Protestant groups, and non-denominational Christians. The Roman Catholic Diocese of Raleigh, the Episcopal Diocese of North Carolina, the North Carolina Annual Conference of the United Methodist Church, and the New Hope Presbytery of the Presbyterian Church (USA) are all headquartered in Raleigh.

Other religions, including Hinduism, Buddhism, Baháʼí, Druze, Taoism, and Shintoism make up 1.31% of religious practitioners. Judaism (0.9%) and Islam (0.8%) are also practiced.

In Wake County, 29% of the population are affiliated with the Southern Baptist Convention, 22% are affiliated with the Catholic Church, 17% are affiliated with the United Methodist Church, 6% are affiliated with the Presbyterian Church (USA), and 27% are religiously affiliated with other denominations, religions, or are not religiously affiliated.

Crime
According to the Federal Bureau of Investigation's Uniform Crime Reports, in 2019 the Raleigh Police Department and other agencies in the city reported 1,222 incidents of violent crime and 8,520 incidents of property crime – far below both the national average and the North Carolina average. Of the violent crimes reported, 5 were murders, 164 were rape/sexual assaults and 322 were robberies. Aggravated assault accounted for 731 of the total violent crimes. Property crimes included burglaries which accounted for 1,200, larcenies for 6,572 and Motor vehicle theft accounted for 748 incidents out of the total.

Economy

Raleigh's industrial base includes financial services, electrical, medical, electronic and telecommunications equipment, clothing and apparel, food processing, paper products, and pharmaceuticals. Raleigh is part of North Carolina's Research Triangle, one of the country's largest and most successful research parks, and a major center in the United States for high-tech and biotech research, as well as advanced textile development. The city is a major retail shipping point for eastern North Carolina and a wholesale distributing point for the grocery industry.

The healthcare and pharmaceutical industry has experienced major growth in recent years with many companies based in Raleigh including PRA Health Sciences, Chiesi USA (subsidiary of Chiesi Farmaceutici), formerly Mallinckrodt prior to tax evasion with Ireland, MAKO Surgical Corp., Metabolon, Inc., TearScience, and American Board of Anesthesiology.

Raleigh was number one on the 2015 Forbes list of the best place for businesses and careers. Companies based in Raleigh include Advance Auto Parts, Bandwidth, Truist Financial, Building Materials Holding Corporation, Capitol Broadcasting Company, Carquest, First Citizens BancShares, Golden Corral, Martin Marietta Materials, PRA Health Sciences, Red Hat, Vontier, Waste Industries, and Lulu.

Social Blade, a website that tracks social media statistics and analytics, and Temple Run developer Imangi Studios are based in Raleigh.

The North Carolina Air National Guard, a unit of the Air National Guard, is also headquartered in Raleigh.

In April 2014 Steven P. Rosenthal of Northland Investment Corp. referred to Raleigh as "a real concentration of brain power. You have a lot of smart people living in the same place. That will drive the economy."

Top employers
According to Raleigh's 2017–18 Comprehensive Annual Financial Report, the top employers in the city are:

Arts and culture

Museums

African American Cultural Complex
Contemporary Art Museum of Raleigh
Gregg Museum of Art & Design at North Carolina State University
Haywood Hall House & Gardens
Marbles Kids Museum
North Carolina Museum of Art
North Carolina Museum of History
North Carolina Museum of Natural Sciences
North Carolina Sports Hall of Fame
City of Raleigh Museum
J. C. Raulston Arboretum
Joel Lane House
Mordecai Plantation
Pope House Museum

Performing arts
The Coastal Credit Union Music Park at Walnut Creek hosts major international touring acts. In 2011, the Downtown Raleigh Amphitheater opened (now sponsored as the Red Hat Amphitheater), which hosts numerous concerts primarily in the summer months. An additional amphitheater sits on the grounds of the North Carolina Museum of Art, which hosts a summer concert series and outdoor movies. Nearby Cary is home to the Koka Booth Amphitheatre which hosts additional summer concerts and outdoor movies, and serves as the venue for regularly scheduled outdoor concerts by the North Carolina Symphony based in Raleigh. During the North Carolina State Fair, Dorton Arena hosts headline acts. The private Lincoln Theatre is one of several clubs in downtown Raleigh that schedules many concerts throughout the year in multiple formats (rock, pop, country).

The Duke Energy Center for the Performing Arts complex houses the Raleigh Memorial Auditorium, the Fletcher Opera Theater, the Kennedy Theatre, and the Meymandi Concert Hall. In 2008, a new theatre space, the Meymandi Theatre at the Murphey School, was opened in the restored auditorium of the historic Murphey School. Theater performances are also offered at the Raleigh Little Theatre, Long View Center, Ira David Wood III Pullen Park Theatre, and Stewart and Thompson Theaters at North Carolina State University.

Raleigh is home to several professional arts organizations, including the North Carolina Symphony, the Opera Company of North Carolina, Theatre in the Park, Burning Coal Theatre Company, the North Carolina Theatre, Broadway Series South and the Carolina Ballet. The numerous local colleges and universities significantly add to the options available for viewing live performances.

Visual arts
North Carolina Museum of Art, occupying a large suburban campus on Blue Ridge Road near the North Carolina State Fairgrounds, maintains one of the premier public art collections located between Washington, D.C., and Atlanta. In addition to its extensive collections of American Art, European Art and ancient art, the museum recently has hosted major exhibitions featuring Auguste Rodin (in 2000) and Claude Monet (in 2006–07), each attracting more than 200,000 visitors. Unlike most prominent public museums, the North Carolina Museum of Art acquired a large number of the works in its permanent collection through purchases with public funds. The museum's outdoor park is one of the largest such art parks in the country. The museum facility underwent a major expansion which greatly expanded the exhibit space that was completed in 2010. The 127,000 sf new expansion is designed by NYC architect Thomas Phifer and Partners.

Raleigh's downtown is also home to many local art galleries such as Art Space in City Market, Visual Art Exchange, and 311 Gallery, on Martin Street, and Bee Hive Studios on Hargett Street. CAM Raleigh is a downtown contemporary art museum, also on Martin Street, that serves to promote new artists and does not house a permanent collection. CAM Raleigh was designed by the award-winning architectural firm Brooks+Scarpa of Los Angeles.

Sports

Professional
The National Hockey League's Carolina Hurricanes franchise moved to Raleigh in 1997 from Hartford, Connecticut (where it was known as the Hartford Whalers). The team played its first two seasons more than 60 miles away at Greensboro Coliseum while its home arena, Raleigh Entertainment and Sports Arena (later RBC Center and now PNC Arena), was under construction. The Hurricanes are the only major league (NFL, NHL, NBA, MLB) professional sports team in North Carolina to have won a championship, winning the Stanley Cup in 2006, over the Edmonton Oilers. The city played host to the 2011 NHL All-Star Game.

In addition to the Hurricanes, the North Carolina FC of the United Soccer League and North Carolina Courage women's professional soccer team play in suburban Cary to the west; the Carolina Mudcats, a Single-A minor-league baseball team, play in the city's eastern suburbs; the newly formed Single-A minor-league baseball Fayetteville Woodpeckers, who formerly played in Buies Creek, began play in the nearby out-of-county southern suburb of Fayetteville when their new ballpark opened in 2019; the Carolina Flyers of the American Ultimate Disc League play primarily at Cardinal Gibbons High School near the PNC Arena; and the Durham Bulls, the AAA minor-league baseball team made internationally famous by the movie Bull Durham, play in the neighboring city of Durham.

Several other professional sports leagues have had former franchises (now defunct) in Raleigh, including the Raleigh IceCaps of the ECHL (1991–1998); Carolina Cobras of the Arena Football League (2000–2004); the Raleigh–Durham Skyhawks of the World League of American Football (1991); the Raleigh Bullfrogs of the Global Basketball Association (1991–1992); the Raleigh Cougars of the United States Basketball League (1997–1999); and most recently, the Carolina Courage of the Women's United Soccer Association (2000–2001 in Chapel Hill, 2001–2003 in suburban Cary), which won that league's championship Founders Cup in 2002.

The Raleigh area has hosted the Professional Golfers' Association (PGA) Nationwide Tour Rex Hospital Open since 1994, with the current location of play at Raleigh's Country Club at Wakefield Plantation. Nearby Prestonwood Country Club hosts the PGA SAS Championship every fall.

Collegiate
North Carolina State University is located in southwest Raleigh where the Wolfpack competes nationally in 24 intercollegiate varsity sports as a member of the Atlantic Coast Conference. The university's football team plays in Carter–Finley Stadium, the second largest football stadium in North Carolina, while the men's basketball team shares the PNC Arena with the Carolina Hurricanes hockey club. The Wolfpack women's basketball, volleyball, and gymnastics as well as men's wrestling events are held on campus at Reynolds Coliseum. The men's baseball team plays at Doak Field.

Amateur
The North Carolina Tigers compete as an Australian rules football club in the United States Australian Football League, in the Eastern Australian Football League.

Raleigh is also home to one of the Cheer Extreme All Stars gyms. In 2009 and again in 2010, Cheer Extreme Raleigh's Small Senior Level 5 Team were silver medalists at the Cheerleading Worlds Competition in Orlando, Florida, and in 2012 they received the bronze medal. Raleigh is also home to one of the Southeast's premier Hardcourt Bike Polo clubs.

Because of the area's many billiards rooms, Raleigh is home to one of the largest amateur league franchises for playing pool, the Raleigh, Durham, Chapel Hill American Poolplayers Association. There are leagues available in formats for players of any skill level.

Parks and recreation
 Raleigh is the home of Raleigh Kubb, both a competitive and non-competitive kubb club. Raleigh Kubb hosts kubb tournaments benefitting various charities in the Raleigh area.

The Raleigh Parks and Recreation Department offers a wide variety of leisure opportunities at more than 200 sites throughout the city, which include:  of park land,  of greenway, 22 community centers, a BMX championship-caliber race track, 112 tennis courts among 25 locations, 5 public lakes, and 8 public aquatic facilities. The park system includes the historic Pullen Park, the oldest public park in North Carolina. The J. C. Raulston Arboretum, an 8-acre (32,000 m2) arboretum and botanical garden in west Raleigh administered by North Carolina State University, maintains a year-round collection that is open daily to the public without charge.

Government
Historically, Raleigh voters have tended to elect conservative Democrats in local, state, and national elections, a holdover from their one-party system of the late 19th century.

City Council

Raleigh operates under a council-manager government. Raleigh City Council consists of eight members; all seats, including the Mayor's, are open for election every two years. Five of the council seats are district representatives and two seats are citywide representatives elected at-large.

Mary-Ann Baldwin, mayor
Jonathan Melton, Council Member, At-Large
Stormie Forte, Council Member, At-Large
Mary Black, Council Member (District A, north-central Raleigh)
Megan Patton, Council Member (District B, northeast Raleigh)
Corey Branch, Council Member (District C, southeast Raleigh)
Jane Harrison, Council Member (District D, southwest Raleigh)
Christina Jones, Council Member (District E, west and northwest Raleigh)

Education

As of 2011, Time ranked Raleigh as the third most educated city in the US based on the percentage of residents who held college degrees. This statistic can most likely be credited to the presence of universities in and around Raleigh, as well as the presence of Research Triangle Park (RTP) to the Northwest.

Higher education

Public
North Carolina State University
Wake Technical Community College

Private
Campbell University Norman Adrian Wiggins School of Law (Baptist)
Meredith College (Baptist)
Montreat College's School of Professional and Adult Studies (Presbyterian)
William Peace University (Presbyterian)
Shaw University (Baptist)
Skema Business School, the first French Business School to open a campus in the USA
St. Augustine's University (Episcopal)

Private, for profit
ECPI College of Technology
The Medical Arts School
Strayer University

Primary and secondary education

Public schools

Public schools in Raleigh are operated by the Wake County Public School System, the largest public school system of the Carolinas. Observers have praised the Wake County Public School System for its innovative efforts to maintain a socially, economically and racial balanced system by using income as a prime factor in assigning students to schools. Raleigh is home to several magnet high schools and several schools offering the International Baccalaureate program. There are four early college high schools in Raleigh. Raleigh also has two alternative high schools.

Wake County Public high schools in Raleigh include:

Traditional schools
Needham B. Broughton High School (International Baccalaureate)
Leesville Road High School
Jesse O. Sanderson High School 
Wakefield High School

Magnet schools
Athens Drive High School
William G. Enloe GT/IB Center for the Humanities, Sciences, and the Arts (International Baccalaureate)
Millbrook High School (International Baccalaureate)
Southeast Raleigh Magnet High School

Alternative schools
Longview School
Mary E. Phillips High School

Early college schools
Wake Young Men's Leadership Academy
Wake Young Women's Leadership Academy
Wake STEM Early College High School
Wake Early College of Health and Sciences

Charter schools
The State of North Carolina provides for a legislated number of charter schools. These schools are administered independently of the Wake County Public School System. Raleigh is currently home to 11 such charter schools:
Casa Esperanza Montessori School (K-8)
Endeavor Charter School (K-8)
Exploris Middle School (1–8)
Hope Elementary School (K-5)
Longleaf School of the Arts (9–12)
Magellan Charter School (3–8)
PreEminent Charter School (K-8)
Quest Academy (K-8)
Raleigh Charter High School (9–12)
Torchlight Academy (K-6)
Woods Charter School (K-12)

State-operated schools
Governor Morehead School, school for the blind

Private and religion-based schools

Al-Iman Islamic School (K-8)
An Noor Quran Academy (3–8)
Bonner Academy (5–8)
Follow the Child Montessori School (K-6)
Friendship Christian School of Raleigh (Baptist, 1–12)
Gethsemane Seventh-day Adventist Church School (K-8)
Grace Christian School (K-12)
Jewish Academy of Wake County (K-3)
Montessori School of Raleigh (K-9)
Neuse Baptist Christian School (K-12)
North Raleigh Christian Academy (Protestant Christian, K-12)
Raleigh Christian Academy (Baptist, K-12)
The Raleigh School (K-5)
Ravenscroft School (K-12)
The Trilogy School (2–12)
Trinity Academy of Raleigh (Protestant Christian, K-12)
Upper Room Christian Academy (closed) (PreK-12)
Wake Christian Academy (K-12)
Word of God Christian Academy (Protestant Christian, K-12)
Thales Academy (PreK-12)

Episcopal schools
St. David's School (Episcopal, K-12)
St. Timothy's School
St. Mary's School (Episcopal, 9–12)

Catholic secondary schools
Cardinal Gibbons High School (Catholic, 9–12)
St. Thomas More Academy (Catholic, 9–12)

Catholic primary schools
The Franciscan School (Catholic, K-8)
Cathedral School (Catholic, PreK-8)
Our Lady of Lourdes Catholic School (K-8)
St. Raphael the Archangel Catholic School (PreK-8)

Media

Print publications
There are several newspapers and periodicals serving Raleigh:

 The News & Observer, a large daily newspaper owned by The McClatchy Company
 The Triangle Downtowner Magazine, a locally owned free monthly print magazine centered around high-density areas of the Triangle with features on dining, entertainment, wine, community, history and more
Technician, student publication of North Carolina State University
 The Carolinian, North Carolina's oldest and largest African-American newspaper published twice weekly
 Midtown Magazine an upscale Raleigh lifestyle magazine
 Raleigh Magazine a glossy print magazine covering exclusively Raleigh
 Walter Magazine a magazine covering Covering the art, culture and people of Raleigh
 The Slammer, a paid bi-weekly newspaper featuring Raleigh crime news
 Carolina Journal, a free monthly newspaper
 Independent Weekly, a free weekly tabloid covering Raleigh, Durham, and the surrounding area

Television

Broadcast
Raleigh is part of the Raleigh-Durham-Fayetteville Designated Market Area, the 24th largest broadcast television market in the United States. The following stations are licensed to Raleigh and/or have significant operations and viewers in the city:

 WUNC-TV (4, PBS): licensed to Chapel Hill, owned by the University of North Carolina
 WRAL-TV (5, NBC): licensed to Raleigh, owned by Capitol Broadcasting Company
 WTVD (11, ABC): licensed to Durham; news bureau located in Raleigh. ABC O&O owned by ABC Owned Television Stations
 WNCN-TV (17, CBS): studios located in Raleigh, licensed to the city of Goldsboro southeast of Raleigh; owned by Nexstar Media Group
 WLFL-TV (22, CW): licensed to Raleigh, owned by Sinclair Broadcast Group
 WRDC (28, MyNet) licensed to Durham, owned by Sinclair Broadcast Group
 WRAY-TV (30, TCT) licensed to Wilson. TCT O&O owned by Tri-State Christian Television
 WUVC-DT (40, Univision) licensed to Fayetteville. Univision O&O owned by TelevisaUnivision
 WRPX-TV (47, Ion) licensed to Rocky Mount, with studios in Raleigh. Ion O&O owned by Ion Media
 WRAZ-TV (50, Fox): licensed to Raleigh, owned by Capitol Broadcasting Company
 WAUG-LD (8, Independent station) licensed to Raleigh, owned and operated by Saint Augustine's College
 WRTD-CD (54, Telemundo): licensed to Raleigh. Telemundo O&O owned by NBCUniversal

Broadcast radio

Public and listener-supported
 WKNC-FM – 88.1 FM (College rock), operated by students of North Carolina State University
 WRKV – 88.9 FM (Contemporary Christian), operated by Educational Media Foundation
 WCPE-FM – 89.7 FM (Classical)
 WUNC-FM – 91.5 FM (National Public Radio, North Carolina Public Radio) operated by the University of North Carolina at Chapel Hill
 WRLY-LP – 93.5 FM (Adult hits), operated by Triangle Access Broadcasting, Inc.
 WKRP-LP – 101.9 FM (Variety), operated by Oak City Media, Inc.

Commercial
 WDCG-FM (G105, Contemporary hit radio)
 WDCG-HD2 (ALT 95.3, Alternative rock, analogue broadcast on 95.3 FM W237BZ)
 WQDR-FM (94.7QDR, Country)
 WBBB-FM 96.1 (Radio 96.1, Adult hits)
 WRAL-FM (Mix 101.5, Adult contemporary)
 WKIX-FM (KIX 102.9, Classic hits)
 WPTF-AM (NewsRadio 680, News/Talk)
 WQOK-FM (K97.5, Hip hop)
 WFXC-FM/WFXK-FM (Foxy 107/104, Urban adult contemporary)
 WRDU-FM (100.7, Classic rock)
 WNCB-FM (93.9 B939 FM, Country)
 WTKK-FM (106.1 FM, News/Talk)
 WNNL-FM (103.9 The Light, Urban contemporary gospel)
 WPLW-FM (96.9 Pulse FM, Contemporary hits)
 WKIX (Just Right Radio 850 and 104.7 FM, Popular standards)
 WQDR-AM (570, classic rock)
 WCLY-AM (That Station, Adult album alternative)
 750 WAUG

Infrastructure

Transportation

Air

Raleigh-Durham International Airport
 
Raleigh-Durham International Airport, the region's primary airport and the second-largest in North Carolina, located northwest of downtown Raleigh via Interstate-40 between Raleigh and Durham, serves the city and greater Research Triangle metropolitan region, as well as much of eastern North Carolina. The airport offers service to more than 50 domestic and international destinations and serves approximately 10 million passengers a year. International destinations include London, Montreal, Toronto, Cancún, Paris, and seasonal service to Keflavík. American Airlines operates the daily service to London Heathrow. Delta Air Lines announced in November 2008 that service from RDU to Paris, France would begin in June 2009, but the route would not take flight until 2016. The airport also offers facilities for cargo and general aviation. The airport authority tripled the size of its Terminal 2 (formerly Terminal C) in January 2011.

Private general aviation airports in Raleigh include Triple W Airport .

Freeways and primary designated routes

Interstate Highways
 traverses the southern part of the city, connecting Raleigh to Durham and Chapel Hill toward the west, and coastal Wilmington, North Carolina to the southeast.
 also known locally as the Raleigh Beltline, it forms part of the inner beltway around central Raleigh, forming the eastern, northern, and western portions, with I-40 forming the southern portion.
 when complete, will be a full outer beltway around Raleigh. The northern and western quadrants are complete and open to traffic, while the remaining two quadrants are currently under construction.
 designated September 5, 2017, follows the former route of Interstate 495. It begins at the I-40/I-440 interchange southeast of Raleigh and runs east, meeting I-540 and currently terminating at Rolesville Road. It is entirely concurrent with US 64. When the route is completed it will link Raleigh to the Norfolk, Virginia area.

United States Highways
 enters the city from the southwest as the US 1/US 64 expressway from Cary, joining I-440 at the I-40 interchange, and leaves I-440 along with US 401 on Capital Boulevard, before leaving the city to the north.
 is the main east–west route through Raleigh; all segments share routes with another highway. It enters the city from the southwest as the US 1/US 64 expressway from Cary, follows I-40 at the western I-440 interchange, briefly joins I-440 in Southeast Raleigh, and then joins I-87 and US 264 along the Knightdale Bypass east of the city. A former alignment, designated as Business US-64, follows New Bern Avenue from the I-440 Beltline to the eastern boundary of the city, where it continues into Knightdale.
 enters the city from the south cosigned with US 401 and NC 50 along Wilmington Street, following South Saunders Street into Downtown Raleigh, through which it follows the paired one-way streets of McDowell and Dawson. North of Downtown it follows Capital Boulevard, Wade Avenue, and Glenwood Avenue before leaving the city to the Northwest heading towards Durham.
 cosigned with US 64 through East Raleigh.
 enters the city from the south cosigned with US 70 and NC 50 along Wilmington Street, following South Saunders Street into Downtown Raleigh, through which it follows the paired one-way streets of McDowell and Dawson. North of Downtown it follows Capital Boulevard and Louisburg Road, before leaving the city to the northeast towards Rolesville.

North Carolina Highways
 follows Chapel Hill Road and Hillsborough Street in West Raleigh. The route ends at its interchange with I-440.
 enters the city from the south cosigned with US 70 and US 401 along Wilmington Street, following South Saunders Street into Downtown Raleigh, through which it follows the paired one-way streets of McDowell and Dawson. North of Downtown it follows Capital Boulevard, Wade Avenue, Glenwood Avenue, and Creedmoor Road, before heading north towards Creedmoor.
 known as Durham Road in North Raleigh, traverses the extreme northeastern part of the city, where it borders Wake Forest.

Intercity rail

Raleigh Union Station is one of Amtrak's busiest stops in the Southern U.S. The station is served by five passenger trains daily: the Silver Star, thrice-daily Piedmont service, and the Carolinian. Daily service is offered between Raleigh and:
Charlotte, with intermediate stops including Cary, Durham, Burlington and Greensboro, North Carolina.
New York City, with intermediate stops including Richmond, Virginia; Washington, D.C.; Baltimore; and Philadelphia.
Miami, with intermediate stops including Columbia, South Carolina, and Savannah, Georgia; as well as Jacksonville, Orlando and Tampa, Florida.

Public transit
Public transportation in and around Raleigh is provided by GoRaleigh (formerly Capital Area Transit), which operates 33 fixed bus routes, including the R-Line and the Wake-Forest Loop. Although there are 33 routes, some routes are designed to cover multiple other routes at times when they are not served. Depending on the time of the day, and the day of the week, the number of routes operating is between 5 and 29.

Raleigh is also served by GoTriangle (formerly Triangle Transit Authority). GoTriangle offers scheduled, fixed-route regional and commuter bus service between Raleigh and the region's other principal cities of Durham, Cary and Chapel Hill, as well as to and from the Raleigh-Durham International Airport, Research Triangle Park and several of the region's larger suburban communities. Triangle Transit also coordinates an extensive vanpool and rideshare program that serves the region's larger employers and commute destinations.

North Carolina State University also maintains its own transit system, the Wolfline, that provides zero-fare bus service to the general public along multiple routes serving the university's campuses in southwest Raleigh.

Government agencies throughout the Raleigh-Durham metropolitan area have struggled with determining the best means of providing fixed-rail transit service for the region.

From 1995 the cornerstone of Triangle Transit's long-term plan was a 28-mile rail corridor from northeast Raleigh, through downtown Raleigh, Cary, and Research Triangle Park, to Durham using DMU technology. There were proposals to extend this corridor 7 miles to Chapel Hill with light rail technology. However, in 2006 Triangle Transit deferred implementation indefinitely when the Federal Transit Administration declined to fund the program due to low ridership projections.

The region's two metropolitan planning organizations appointed a group of local citizens in 2007 to reexamine options for future transit development in light of Triangle Transit's problems. The Special Transit Advisory Commission (STAC) retained many of the provisions of Triangle Transit's original plan, but recommended adding new bus services and raising additional revenues by adding a new local half-cent sales tax to fund the project.

Greyhound Lines provides an inter-city bus service to Durham, Charlotte, Richmond, Washington, D.C., Atlanta, and other cities.

Bicycle and pedestrian
The Maine-to-Florida U.S. Bicycle Route#1 routes through suburban Raleigh, along with N.C. Bicycle Route #2, the "Mountains To Sea" route. As of September 2010, maps and signage for both US Bike Route No. 1 and NC Bike Route No. 2 are out-of-date for the Raleigh area. N.C. Bicycle Route #5 is routed nearby, connecting Apex to Wilmington and closely paralleling the NCBC Randonneurs 600-kilometer brevet route.
Most public buses are equipped with bicycle racks, and some roads have dedicated bicycle-only lanes. Bicyclists and pedestrians also may use Raleigh's extensive greenway system, with paths and trails located throughout the city.
In May 2011, Raleigh was designated a Bicycle Friendly Community by the League of American Bicyclists at the Bronze level.
A 2011 study by Walk Score ranked Raleigh 36th most walkable of fifty largest U.S. cities.
In 2002, the "Walk [Your City]" initiative was started in the city which provides a tool kit for neighborhood organizations to post signs giving a distance by bike or foot, with directions in scannable QR code. The movement has spread to more than 400 communities in 55 countries.

Public safety
The Raleigh Fire Department provides fire protection throughout the city. The North Carolina Correctional Institution for Women, the state's primary correctional facility housing female inmates, is based in Raleigh.

Notable people

Sister cities
Raleigh has several sister cities:
 Compiègne, Oise, Hauts-de-France, France
 Kingston upon Hull, England, United Kingdom
 Rostock, Mecklenburg-Vorpommern, Germany
 Nairobi, Kenya
 Gibraltar, Gibraltar, United Kingdom

See also

 List of capitals in the United States
 List of municipalities in North Carolina
 National Register of Historic Places listings in Wake County, North Carolina
 USS Raleigh, 4 ships

Notes

References

Further reading

Benjamin, Karen (March 2012). "Suburbanizing Jim Crow: The Impact of School Policy on Residential Segregation in Raleigh". Journal of Urban History, 38(2), pp. 225–46. .

External links
 

 
 
Raleigh Directory: 1875, 1883, 1896, 1903, 1927
 Guide to the Ray Winstead Collection of Aerial Photographs of Raleigh, North Carolina Circa 1970

 
1792 establishments in North Carolina
Cities in Durham County, North Carolina
Cities in Wake County, North Carolina
County seats in North Carolina
Planned cities in the United States
Populated places established in 1792
Populated places on the Neuse River
Research Triangle
Walter Raleigh
Capitals of North Carolina